This page lists some links to ancient philosophy, namely philosophical thought extending as far as early post-classical history.

Overview
Genuine philosophical thought, depending upon original individual insights, arose in many cultures roughly contemporaneously. Karl Jaspers termed the intense period of philosophical development beginning around the 7th century BCE and concluding around the 3rd century BCE an Axial Age in human thought.

In Western philosophy, the spread of Christianity in the Roman Empire marked the ending of Hellenistic philosophy and ushered in the beginnings of medieval philosophy, whereas in the Middle East, the spread of Islam through the Arab Empire marked the end of Old Iranian philosophy and ushered in the beginnings of early Islamic philosophy.

Ancient Greek and Roman philosophy

Philosophers

Pre-Socratic philosophers
 Milesian School
Thales (624 – c 546 BCE)
Anaximander (610 – 546 BCE)
Anaximenes of Miletus (c. 585 – c. 525 BCE)
 Pythagoreans
Pythagoras (582 – 496 BCE)
Philolaus (470 – 380 BCE)
Alcmaeon of Croton
Archytas (428 – 347 BCE)
 Heraclitus (535 – 475 BCE)
 Eleatic School
Xenophanes (570 – 470 BCE)
Parmenides (510 – 440 BCE)
Zeno of Elea (490 – 430 BCE)
Melissus of Samos (c. 470 BCE – ?)
 Pluralists
Empedocles (490 – 430 BCE)
Anaxagoras (500 – 428 BCE)
 Atomists
Leucippus (first half of 5th century BCE)
Democritus (460 – 370 BCE)
Metrodorus of Chios (4th century BCE)
 Pherecydes of Syros (6th century BCE)
 Sophists
Protagoras (490 – 420 BCE)
Gorgias (487 – 376 BCE)
Antiphon (480 – 411 BCE)
Prodicus (465/450 – after 399 BCE)
Hippias (middle of the 5th century BCE)
Thrasymachus (459 – 400 BCE)
Callicles
Critias
Lycophron
 Diogenes of Apollonia ( – ?)

Classical Greek philosophers
 Socrates (469 – 399 BCE)
 Euclid of Megara (450 – 380 BCE)
 Antisthenes (445 – 360 BCE)
 Aristippus (435 – 356 BCE)
 Plato (428 – 347 BCE)
 Speusippus (407 – 339 BCE)
 Diogenes of Sinope (400 – 325 BCE)
 Xenocrates (396 – 314 BCE)
 Aristotle (384 – 322 BCE)
 Stilpo (380 – 300 BCE)
 Theophrastus (370 – 288 BCE)

Hellenistic philosophy
 Pyrrho (365 – 275 BCE)
 Epicurus (341 – 270 BCE)
 Metrodorus of Lampsacus (the younger) (331 – 278 BCE)
 Zeno of Citium (333 – 263 BCE)
 Cleanthes ( – )
 Timon (320 – 230 BCE)
 Arcesilaus (316 – 232 BCE)
 Menippus (3rd century BCE)
 Archimedes ( – 212 BCE)
 Chrysippus (280 – 207 BCE)
 Carneades (214 – 129 BCE)
 Clitomachus (187 – 109 BCE)
 Metrodorus of Stratonicea (late 2nd century BCE)
 Philo of Larissa (160 – 80 BCE)
 Posidonius (135 – 51 BCE)
 Antiochus of Ascalon (130 – 68 BCE)
 Aenesidemus (1st century BCE)
 Agrippa (1st century CE)

Hellenistic schools of thought
 Academic skepticism
 Cynicism
 Cyrenaicism
 Eclecticism
 Epicureanism
 Middle Platonism
 Neo-Platonism
 Neopythagoreanism
 Peripatetic School
 Pyrrhonism
 Stoicism
 Sophism

Early Roman and Christian philosophy
See also:  Christian philosophy
 Neoplatonism in Christianity
 School of the Sextii

Philosophers during Roman times

 Cicero (106 – 43 BCE)
 Lucretius (94 – 55 BCE)
 Seneca (4 BCE – 65 CE)
 Musonius Rufus (30 – 100 CE)
 Plutarch (45 – 120 CE)
 Epictetus (55 – 135 CE)
 Favorinus ( – ) 
 Marcus Aurelius (121 – 180 CE)
 Clement of Alexandria (150 – 215 CE)
 Alcinous (philosopher) (2nd century CE)
 Sextus Empiricus (3rd century CE)
 Alexander of Aphrodisias (3rd century CE)
 Ammonius Saccas (3rd century CE)
 Plotinus (205 – 270 CE)
 Porphyry (232 – 304 CE)
 Iamblichus (242 – 327 CE)
 Themistius (317 – 388 CE)
 Ambrose (340 – 397 CE)
 Augustine of Hippo (354 – 430 CE)
 Proclus (411 – 485 CE)
 Damascius (462 – 540 CE)
 Boethius (472 – 524 CE)
 Simplicius of Cilicia (490 – 560 CE)
 John Philoponus (490 – 570 CE)

Ancient Iranian philosophy

See also: Dualism, Dualism (philosophy of mind)

While there are ancient relations between the Indian Vedas and the Iranian Avesta, the two main families of the Indo-Iranian philosophical traditions were characterized by fundamental differences in their implications for the human being's position in society and their view of man's role in the universe. The first charter of human rights by Cyrus the Great as understood in the Cyrus cylinder is often seen as a reflection of the questions and thoughts expressed by Zarathustra and developed in Zoroastrian schools of thought of the Achaemenid Era of Iranian history.

Schools of thought
Ideas and tenets of Zoroastrian schools of Early Persian philosophy are part of many works written in Middle Persian and of the extant scriptures of the zoroastrian religion in Avestan language. Among these are treatises such as the Shikand-gumanic Vichar by Mardan-Farrux Ohrmazddadan, selections of Denkard, Wizidagīhā-ī Zātspram ("Selections of Zātspram") as well as older passages of the book Avesta, the Gathas which are attributed to Zarathustra himself and regarded as his "direct teachings".

Zoroastrianism
 Zarathustra
 Jamasp
 Ostanes
 Mardan-Farrux Ohrmazddadan
 Adurfarnbag Farroxzadan
 Adurbad Emedan
 Avesta
 Gathas
Anacharsis

Pre-Manichaean thought
 Bardesanes

Manichaeism
 Mani ( – 276 CE)
 Ammo

Mazdakism
 Mazdak the Elder
 Mazdak (died c. 524 or 528 CE)

Zurvanism
 Aesthetic Zurvanism
 Materialist Zurvanism
 Fatalistic Zurvanism

Philosophy and the Empire
 Political philosophy
 Tansar
 University of Gundishapur
 Borzouye
 Bakhtshooa Gondishapuri
 Emperor Khosrau's philosophical discourses
 Paul the Persian

Literature
 Pahlavi literature

Ancient Jewish philosophy
See also:  Jewish philosophy
 Hillel the Elder ( – 10CE)
 Philo of Alexandria (30 BCE – 45 CE)
 Rabbi Akiva ( – )

Ancient Indian philosophy

The ancient Indian philosophy is a fusion of two ancient traditions: the Vedic tradition and the śramaṇa tradition.

Vedic philosophy
Indian philosophy begins with the Vedas wherein questions pertaining to laws of nature, the origin of the universe and the place of man in it are asked. In the famous Rigvedic Hymn of Creation (Nasadiya Sukta) the poet asks:

 "Whence all creation had its origin,
 he, whether he fashioned it or whether he did not,
 he, who surveys it all from highest heaven,
 he knows—or maybe even he does not know."

In the Vedic view, creation is ascribed to the self-consciousness of the primeval being (Purusha). This leads to the inquiry into the one being that underlies the diversity of empirical phenomena and the origin of all things.  Cosmic order is termed rta and causal law by karma. Nature (prakriti) is taken to have three qualities (sattva, rajas, and tamas).
 Vedas
 Upanishads
 Hindu philosophy

Sramana philosophy

Jainism and Buddhism are continuation of the Sramana school of thought. The Sramanas cultivated a pessimistic worldview of the samsara as full of suffering and advocated renunciation and austerities. They laid stress on philosophical concepts like Ahimsa, Karma, Jnana, Samsara and Moksa. Cārvāka (Sanskrit: चार्वाक) (atheist) philosophy, also known as Lokāyata, it is a system of Hindu philosophy that assumes various forms of philosophical skepticism and religious indifference. It is named after its founder, Cārvāka, author of the Bārhaspatya-sūtras.

Classical Indian philosophy
In classical times, these inquiries were systematized in six schools of philosophy. Some of the questions asked were:
 What is the ontological nature of consciousness?
 How is cognition itself experienced?
 Is mind (chit) intentional or not?
 Does cognition have its own structure?

The six schools of Indian philosophy are:
 Nyaya
 Vaisheshika
 Samkhya
 Yoga
 Mimamsa (Purva Mimamsa)
 Vedanta (Uttara Mimamsa)

Ancient Indian philosophers

1st millennium BCE
 Parashara – writer of Viṣṇu Purāṇa.

Philosophers of Vedic Age (c. 1500 – c. 600 BCE)
 Rishi Narayana – seer of the Purusha Sukta of the Rig Veda.
 Seven Rishis – Atri, Bharadwaja, Gautama, Jamadagni, Kasyapa, Vasishtha, Viswamitra.
 Other Vedic Rishis – Gritsamada, Sandilya, Kanva etc.
 Rishaba – Rishi mentioned in Rig Veda and later in several Puranas, and believed by Jains to be the first official religious guru of Jainism, as accredited by later followers.
 Yajnavalkya – one of the Vedic sages, greatly influenced Buddhistic thought.
Lopamudra 
Gargi Vachaknavi
Maitreyi
Parshvanatha
Ghosha
 Angiras – one of the seers of the Atharva Veda and author of Mundaka Upanishad.
 Uddalaka Aruni – an Upanishadic sage who authored major portions of Chāndogya Upaniṣad.
 Ashvapati – a King in the Later Vedic age who authored Vaishvanara Vidya of Chāndogya Upaniṣad.
 Ashtavakra – an Upanishadic Sage mentioned in the Mahabharata, who authored Ashtavakra Gita.

Philosophers of Axial Age (600–185 BCE)
 Gotama, logician, author of Nyaya Sutra
 Kanada, founded the philosophical school of Vaisheshika, gave theory of atomism
 Mahavira (599–527 BCE) – heavily influenced Jainism, the 24th Tirthankara of Jainism.
Purana Kassapa
Ajita Kesakambali
Payasi
Makkhali Gośāla
Sañjaya Belaṭṭhiputta
Mahavira
Dandamis
Nagasena
Lakulisha

 Pakudha Kaccayana
 Pāṇini (520–460 BCE), grammarian, author of Ashtadhyayi
 Kapila, proponent of the Samkhya system of philosophy.
 Badarayana (lived between 500 BCE and 400 BCE) – Author of Brahma Sutras.
 Jaimini, author of Purva Mimamsa Sutras.
 Pingala, author of the Chandas shastra
 Gautama Buddha ( – ), founder of Buddhist school of thought
Śāriputra
 Chanakya ( – ), author of Arthashastra, professor (acharya) of political science at the Takshashila University
 Patañjali, developed the philosophy of Raja Yoga in his Yoga Sutras.
 Shvetashvatara – Author of earliest textual exposition of a systematic philosophy of Shaivism.

Philosophers of Golden Age (184 BCE – 600 CE)
 Valluvar, wrote the Kural text, a treatise on secular ethics.
Aśvaghoṣa, He is believed to have been the first Sanskrit dramatist, and is considered the greatest Indian poet prior to Kālidāsa.   
Vatsyana, Famous for "Kama Sutra"
Samantabhadra, He was a proponent of the Jaina doctrine of Anekantavada.
Isvarakrsna,
Aryadeva, Aryadeva was a student of Nagarjuna and contributed significantly to the Madhyamaka
Dharmakirti
Haribhadra
Pujyapada
Buddhaghosa
Kamandaka
Maticandra
Prashastapada
Bhāviveka
Dharmapala
Udyotakara
Gaudapada
Siddhasena
 Dignāga, one of the founders of Buddhist school of Indian logic.
 Asanga, exponent of the Yogacara
 Bhartrihari (–510 CE), early figure in Indic linguistic theory
 Bodhidharma (–528 CE), founder of the Zen school of Buddhism
 Siddhasena Divākara (5th century CE), Jain logician and author of important works in Sanskrit and Prakrit, such as, Nyāyāvatāra (on Logic) and Sanmatisūtra (dealing with the seven Jaina standpoints, knowledge and the objects of knowledge)
 Vasubandhu, one of the main founders of the Indian Yogacara school.
 Kundakunda (2nd century CE), exponent of Jain mysticism and Jain nayas dealing with the nature of the soul and its contamination by matter, author of Pañcāstikāyasāra (Essence of the Five Existents), the Pravacanasāra (Essence of the Scripture) and the Samayasāra (Essence of the Doctrine)
 Nagarjuna ( – 250 CE), the founder of the Madhyamaka (Middle Path) school of Mahāyāna Buddhism.
 Umāsvāti or Umasvami (2nd century CE), author of first Jain work in Sanskrit, Tattvārthasūtra, expounding the Jain philosophy in a most systematized form acceptable to all sects of Jainism.
 Adi Shankara – philosopher and theologian, most renowned exponent of the Advaita Vedanta school of philosophy.

Ancient Chinese philosophy

Chinese philosophy is the dominant philosophical thought in China and other countries within the East Asian cultural sphere that share a common language, including Japan, Korea, and Vietnam.

Schools of thought

Hundred Schools of Thought

The Hundred Schools of Thought were philosophers and schools that flourished from the 6th century to 221 BCE, an era of great cultural and intellectual expansion in China. Even though this period – known in its earlier part as the Spring and Autumn period and the Warring States period – in its latter part was fraught with chaos and bloody battles, it is also known as the Golden Age of Chinese philosophy because a broad range of thoughts and ideas were developed and discussed freely. The thoughts and ideas discussed and refined during this period have profoundly influenced lifestyles and social consciousness up to the present day in East Asian countries. The intellectual society of this era was characterized by itinerant scholars, who were often employed by various state rulers as advisers on the methods of government, war, and diplomacy. This period ended with the rise of the Qin Dynasty and the subsequent purge of dissent. The Book of Han lists ten major schools, they are:
 Confucianism, which teaches that human beings are teachable, improvable and perfectible through personal and communal endeavour especially including self-cultivation and self-creation. A main idea of Confucianism is the cultivation of virtue and the development of moral perfection. Confucianism holds that one should give up one's life, if necessary, either passively or actively, for the sake of upholding the cardinal moral values of ren and yi.
 Legalism. Often compared with Machiavelli, and foundational for the traditional Chinese bureaucratic empire, the Legalists examined administrative methods, emphasizing a realistic consolidation of the wealth and power of autocrat and state.
 Taoism (also called Daoism), a philosophy which emphasizes the Three Jewels of the Tao: compassion, moderation, and humility, while Taoist thought generally focuses on nature, the relationship between humanity and the cosmos; health and longevity; and wu wei (action through inaction). Harmony with the Universe, or the source thereof (Tao), is the intended result of many Taoist rules and practices.
 Mohism, which advocated the idea of universal love: Mozi believed that "everyone is equal before heaven", and that people should seek to imitate heaven by engaging in the practice of collective love. His epistemology can be regarded as primitive materialist empiricism; he believed that human cognition ought to be based on one's perceptions – one's sensory experiences, such as sight and hearing – instead of imagination or internal logic, elements founded on the human capacity for abstraction. Mozi advocated frugality, condemning the Confucian emphasis on ritual and music, which he denounced as extravagant.
 Naturalism, the School of Naturalists or the Yin-yang school, which synthesized the concepts of yin and yang and the Five Elements; Zou Yan is considered the founder of this school.
 Agrarianism, or the School of Agrarianism, which advocated peasant utopian communalism and egalitarianism. The Agrarians believed that Chinese society should be modeled around that of the early sage king Shen Nong, a folk hero which was portrayed in Chinese literature as "working in the fields, along with everyone else, and consulting with everyone else when any decision had to be reached."
 The Logicians or the School of Names, which focused on definition and logic. It is said to have parallels with that of the Ancient Greek sophists or dialecticians. The most notable Logician was Gongsun Longzi.
 The School of Diplomacy or School of Vertical and Horizontal [Alliances], which focused on practical matters instead of any moral principle, so it stressed political and diplomatic tactics, and debate and lobbying skill. Scholars from this school were good orators, debaters and tacticians.
 The Miscellaneous School, which integrated teachings from different schools; for instance, Lü Buwei found scholars from different schools to write a book called Lüshi Chunqiu cooperatively. This school tried to integrate the merits of various schools and avoid their perceived flaws.
 The School of "Minor-talks", which was not a unique school of thought, but a philosophy constructed of all the thoughts which were discussed by and originated from normal people on the street.
 Another group is the School of the Military that studied strategy and the philosophy of war; Sunzi and Sun Bin were influential leaders. However, this school was not one of the "Ten Schools" defined by Hanshu.

Early Imperial China
The founder of the Qin Dynasty, who implemented Legalism as the official philosophy, quashed Mohist and Confucianist schools. Legalism remained influential until the emperors of the Han Dynasty adopted Daoism and later Confucianism as official doctrine. These latter two became the determining forces of Chinese thought until the introduction of Buddhism.

Confucianism was particularly strong during the Han Dynasty, whose greatest thinker was Dong Zhongshu, who integrated Confucianism with the thoughts of the Zhongshu School and the theory of the Five Elements. He also was a promoter of the New Text school, which considered Confucius as a divine figure and a spiritual ruler of China, who foresaw and started the evolution of the world towards the Universal Peace. In contrast, there was an Old Text school that advocated the use of Confucian works written in ancient language (from this comes the denomination Old Text) that were so much more reliable. In particular, they refuted the assumption of Confucius as a godlike figure and considered him as the greatest sage, but simply a human and mortal.

The 3rd and 4th centuries saw the rise of the Xuanxue (mysterious learning), also called Neo-Taoism. The most important philosophers of this movement were Wang Bi, Xiang Xiu and Guo Xiang. The main question of this school was whether Being came before Not-Being (in Chinese, ming and wuming). A peculiar feature of these Taoist thinkers, like the Seven Sages of the Bamboo Grove, was the concept of feng liu (lit. wind and flow), a sort of romantic spirit which encouraged following the natural and instinctive impulse.

Buddhism arrived in China around the 1st century AD, but it was not until the Northern and Southern, Sui and Tang Dynasties that it gained considerable influence and acknowledgement. At the beginning, it was considered a sort of Taoist sect, and there was even a theory about Laozi, founder of Taoism, who went to India and taught his philosophy to Buddha. Mahayana Buddhism was far more successful in China than its rival Hinayana, and both Indian schools and local Chinese sects arose from the 5th century. Two chiefly important monk philosophers were Sengzhao and Daosheng. But probably the most influential and original of these schools was the Chan sect, which had an even stronger impact in Japan as the Zen sect.

Philosophers
 Taoism
 Laozi (5th–4th century BCE)
 Zhuangzi (4th century BCE)
 Zhang Daoling
 Zhang Jue (died 184 CE)
 Ge Hong (283 – 343 CE)
 Confucianism
 Confucius
 Mencius
 Xun Zi ( – 230 BCE)
 Legalism
 Li Si
 Li Kui
 Han Fei
 Mi Su Yu
 Shang Yang
 Shen Buhai
 Shen Dao
 Mohism
 Mozi
 Song Xing
 Logicians
 Deng Xi
 Hui Shi (380–305 BCE)
 Gongsun Long ( – )
 Agrarianism
 Xu Xing
 Naturalism
 Zou Yan (305 – 240 BCE)
 Neotaoism
 Wang Bi
 Guo Xiang
 Xiang Xiu
 School of Diplomacy
 Guiguzi
 Su Qin (380 – 284 BCE)
 Zhang Yi (bef. 329 – 309 BCE)
 Yue Yi
 Li Yiji (268 – 204 BCE)
 Military strategy
 Sunzi
 Sun Bin (died 316 BCE)

See also
Index of ancient philosophy articles
Wisdom literature

References

Further reading
Luchte, James, Early Greek Thought: Before the Dawn, in series Bloomsbury Studies in Ancient Philosophy, Bloomsbury Publishing, London, 2011.

External links